The CSV qualification for the 2014 FIVB Volleyball Men's World Championship saw member nations compete for three places at the finals in Poland. The two best-ranked teams from the 2013 Men's South American Volleyball Championship, plus one team from the qualification tournament qualified for the 2014 World Championship.

Participating nations
7 CSV national teams entered qualification. Uruguay later withdrew.

2013 South American Championship

Venue:  Ginásio Poliesportivo Alfredo Barreto, Cabo Frio, Brazil
Dates: 6–10 August 2013

The next four teams were supposed to advance to the final qualification tournament but with only three teams remaining Venezuela got another chance to participate in the qualification tournament. Venezuela had a flight problem and couldn't reach Cabo Frio in time for the South American Championship.

Qualification tournament
Venue:  Polideportivo Sur de Envigado, Envigado, Colombia
Dates: 13–15 September 2013
All times are Colombia Time (UTC−05:00)

|}

|}

References

2014 FIVB Volleyball Men's World Championship
2013 in volleyball